In the French hotel industry, the term palace is particularly reserved for certain establishments, in a strict sense, specifically being used to describe a luxury hotel. Since 2010, the title has been officially designated by Atout France as a grade classification of certain French hotels, around half of which are located in Paris. It is exclusively awarded to five-star hotels offering the highest level of service to their customers. At the end of August 2017, only 24 hotels out of 343 have been admitted to this category.

The term is used sometimes by other French hotels (at least in their commercial name; for example, the former  in Paris) that do not yet meet the criteria defined by law.

List of French official Palace hotels

Notes

References 

 Sous la direction d'Alain Rey, Dictionnaire historique de la langue française deuxième édition, tome II F-PR, Dictionnaires le Robert, Paris 1998, 4.302 p.  ainsi que Centre National de Ressources Textuelles et Lexicales, Dictionnaire le Trésor
 Le guide Michelin rouge France, Monaco et Andorre 2012, Michelin, Clermont-Ferrand 2012. 
 Léon-Paul Fargue, Le Piéton de Paris, Gallimard, Paris 1938
 Rapport sur la création d'une catégorie « Palaces » parmi les établissements cinq étoiles du nouveau classement hôtelier, de François Delahaye et Pierre Ferchaud, avec la participation d'Alain Simon, septembre 2010 
 Marc Boyer, Histoire générale du tourisme du XVIe au XXIe siècle, Éditions l'Harmattan, Paris 2005.  extrait

External links 
In French:
 Atout France – La Distinction Palace
 Distinction Palace officielle (publiée par Atout France) : 5 mai 2011 ; 14 septembre 2011 ; 29 juin 2012 ; 27 june 2013
 Les conditions d'éligibilité à la « distinction Palace » (document édité et révisé par Atout France) 
 Les critères d'appréciation du jury (document édité par Atout France) 
 Tous sur les 13 hôtels Palace en France - Situation - Actualités - Informations 
 Palaces et Grands Hotels de France 

Hotels in Paris